Coccymys kirrhos is a rodent in the family Muridae that is native to New Guinea. The species was described in 2009.

References

Coccymys
Rodents of New Guinea
Mammals described in 2009